USNS Leroy Grumman (T-AO-195) is a  of the United States Navy.

Design
The s were preceded by the shorter s.

They were built without armaments but can be fitted with close-in weapon systems. The ship has a helicopter platform but not any maintenance facilities. It has a complement of eighty-nine civilians (nineteen officers), twenty-nine spare crew, and six United States Navy crew.

Construction and delivery
Leroy Grumman, the ninth ship of the Henry J. Kaiser class and first U.S. Navy ship to bear the name, was laid down at Avondale Shipyard, Inc., at New Orleans, Louisiana, on 6 July 1987 and launched on 3 December 1988. She entered non-commissioned U.S. Navy service under the control of the Military Sealift Command with a primarily civilian crew on 3 August 1989.

Service history
Leroy Grumman serves in the United States Atlantic Fleet.

In early 2012, she joined several British warships from the Royal Navy including the aircraft carrier HMS Illustrious and fleet flagship HMS Bulwark to partake in Exercise Joint Warrior and other training missions with warships from the United Kingdom, Norway and the Netherlands.

Leroy Grumman docked in Boston in January 2020 for scheduled maintenance by Boston Ship Repair, slated to go until the end of May.

Incidents

During the coronavirus pandemic, on 30 April 2020, USNI News reported that two civilian mariners on Leroy Grumman had been infected with SARS-CoV-2. By 5 May, 18 sailors had tested positive, including the ship's medic. About 50 people were on board and all were placed under quarantine. The source of the infection was unclear, but a spokesperson for Military Sealift Command stated that there were outside contractors at the shipyard who had tested positive earlier.

On 19 May 2020, the Project On Government Oversight and The Daily Beast reported that 22 crew members and 30 contractors had tested positive for the virus, and that a 60-year-old contractor who worked in the engine room had died of the virus.  In addition, it was reported that mariners had complained about how MSC was "being reactive rather than proactive," and that, despite the issuance of a gangway up order that required all civilian mariners on leave to return to the ship and prevented all mariners from leaving the ship, contractors and other personnel were allowed to embark and disembark with virtually no restrictions, except for random temperature checks and a self-report questionnaire. The ship was eventually vacated on 8 May 2020 for seven days.

On 21 May, a civilian mariner was declared dead due to complications of the virus. He was hospitalized on 30 April, and was placed on a ventilator in an ICU on 4 May. The deceased was the first civilian mariner to die of the virus on an MSC ship.

Notes

References

External links

 NavSource Online: Service Ship Photo Archive: USNS Leroy Grumman (T-AO-195)
 USNS Leroy Grumman (T-AO-195)

 

Henry J. Kaiser-class oilers
Cold War auxiliary ships of the United States
Ships built in Bridge City, Louisiana
1988 ships